The Women's ski slopestyle competition at the FIS Freestyle Ski and Snowboarding World Championships 2019 will be held on February 6, 2019. Due to bad weather conditions, the competition was moved back one day.

Qualification
The first four skiers of each heat qualify for the final.

Heat 1

Heat 2

References

Women's ski slopestyle